Chahar Bagh Boulevard (translation: Four Gardens) is a historical avenue in Isfahan constructed in the Safavid era of Iran. This histories street is very similar to the Champs-Élysées in Paris, which some visitors called the Champs-Élysées of Isfahan.

The avenue, historically, is the most famous in all of Persia. It connects the northern parts of the city to the southern sections and is about 6 kilometers long. On the east side of this street, there are the Hasht Behesht and Chehel Sotoun gardens.

History
Shah Abbas I was the king who changed his capital from Qazvin to Esfahan and decided to pour all the country's artistic wealth into that central spot which has been dubbed for centuries "Nisfi Jahan" or "Half the World". The chief architect of this task of urban planning was Shaykh Bahai (Baha' ad-Din al-'Amili), who focused the programme on two key features of Shah Abbas's master plan: the Chahar Bagh avenue, flanked at either side by all the prominent institutions of the city, such as the residences of all foreign dignitaries, and the Naqsh-e Jahan Square ("Exemplar of the World").

Sections

Chaharbagh Pa'in
Chaharbagh Pa'in, or lower Chaharbagh, is the northern section of the avenue. This part of Chaharbagh is from Shohada Square to Darvazeh Dowlat.

Chaharbagh Abbasi
Chaharbagh Abbasi, is the middle section of the avenue. This part of Chaharbagh is from Darvazeh Dowlat to Northern 33 pol at Enqelab Square.

Chaharbagh Bala
Chaharbagh Bala, or upper Chaharbagh, is the southern section of the avenue. This part of Chaharbagh is from southern 33 pol to Azadi Square.

References

Buildings and structures in Isfahan
Streets in Isfahan
Boulevards
17th century in Iran
Persian gardens in Iran
Urban public parks
Tourist attractions in Isfahan